Midville is a city in Burke County, Georgia, United States. The population was 269 at the 2010 census. It is part of the Augusta, Georgia metropolitan area.

History
The Georgia General Assembly incorporated Midville as a town in 1877. The community was so named on account of its central location between Macon and Savannah.

Geography
Midville is located in the southwest corner of Burke County at  (32.821321, -82.236586). The southern border of the city is the Ogeechee River, which is also the county line.

Demographics

As of the 2010 United States Census, there were 269 people living in the city. The racial makeup of the city was 49.8% Black, 46.5% White, 0.7% Asian and 1.1% from two or more races. 1.9% were Hispanic or Latino of any race.

As of the census of 2000, there were 457 people, 185 households, and 121 families living in the city. The racial makeup of the city was 66.74% African American, 30.85% White and 2.41% from two or more races.

There were 185 households, out of which 24.3% had children under the age of 18 living with them, 40.0% were married couples living together, 21.1% had a female householder with no husband present, and 34.1% were non-families. 31.9% of all households were made up of individuals, and 20.0% had someone living alone who was 65 years of age or older.  The average household size was 2.47 and the average family size was 3.07.

In the city, the population was spread out, with 24.9% under the age of 18, 8.8% from 18 to 24, 22.1% from 25 to 44, 22.3% from 45 to 64, and 21.9% who were 65 years of age or older.  The median age was 40 years. For every 100 females, there were 77.8 males.  For every 100 females age 18 and over, there were 69.8 males.

The median income for a household in the city was $19,625, and the median income for a family was $35,417. Males had a median income of $34,286 versus $21,250 for females. The per capita income for the city was $9,408.  About 18.9% of families and 23.8% of the population were below the poverty line, including 18.6% of those under age 18 and 44.2% of those age 65 or over.

Notable people
 Tedi Thurman, model and television personality, was born in Midville.
 Pat Dye, former football coach at Auburn University.
 William Pierce (serial killer), serial killer who murdered 9 people across 3 states from June 1970 to January 1971.

See also

Central Savannah River Area

References

External links
 Sherman at Midville historical marker

Cities in Georgia (U.S. state)
Cities in Burke County, Georgia
Augusta metropolitan area